The Geneva Conventions (Amendment) Act 1995 (c27) made provision for the amendment of the United Kingdom's Geneva Conventions Act 1957 to enable the addition of Protocol I and Protocol II to the Geneva Conventions of 1949, to be incorporated into the law of England (and Wales), Scotland, Northern Ireland, the Channel Islands, the Isle of Man, and British colonies.

References

United Kingdom Acts of Parliament 1995
National laws incorporating the Geneva Conventions